Saad Nasim (Punjabi, ; born 29 April 1990) is a Pakistani International cricketer. He is a right-handed middle-order batsman and also a legbreak spin bowler. He has played domestic cricket for WAPDA cricket team, Pakistan A and Lahore Lions. He represented Quetta Gladiators in Pakistan Super League.

He made his Twenty20 International debut for Pakistan against Australia in the United Arab Emirates in October 2014. He made his One Day International debut for Pakistan against Bangladesh in April 2015.

He was the leading run-scorer for Lahore Blues in the 2017–18 Quaid-e-Azam Trophy, with 561 runs in ten matches.

In April 2018, he was named in Federal Areas' squad for the 2018 Pakistan Cup. He was the leading run-scorer for Lahore Blues in the 2018–19 Quaid-e-Azam One Day Cup, with 316 runs in seven matches. He was also the leading run-scorer for Lahore Blues in the 2018–19 Quaid-e-Azam Trophy, with 469 runs in ten matches.

In September 2019, he was named in Central Punjab's squad for the 2019–20 Quaid-e-Azam Trophy tournament. In January 2021, he was named in Central Punjab's squad for the 2020–21 Pakistan Cup.

References

External links

1990 births
Living people
Pakistani cricketers
Cricketers from Lahore
Punjab (Pakistan) cricketers
Lahore cricketers
Lahore Blues cricketers
Water and Power Development Authority cricketers
Pakistan One Day International cricketers
Pakistan Twenty20 International cricketers
Quetta Gladiators cricketers
Peshawar Zalmi cricketers
Negombo Cricket Club cricketers
Central Punjab cricketers
People from Lahore